The Flint River Railroad is a defunct railroad. It was established on December 6, 1871, to construct a  branch from Horton to Otter Lake to support the logging industry in the Flint River area. This line was opened on October 8, 1872, and the company was consolidated with the Flint and Pere Marquette Railroad (F&PM). In 1881 the F&PM extended this line  to Fostoria.

The C&O abandoned the remainder in 1972. A section of the line is now operated by the heritage Huckleberry Railroad.

Notes

References 

Railway companies established in 1871
Railway companies disestablished in 1872
Transportation in Genesee County, Michigan
Defunct Michigan railroads
Predecessors of the Pere Marquette Railway